My Last and Best Album is the third and final studio album released by Braintax. It was the 50th CD release on Low Life Records.

The album was released on 10 March 2008.

Track listing
 "Magnum on Crack" - 2.34
 "Fix Up Come On" - 3.58
 "Retail" - 3.27 
 "Real People" - 3.17
 "Duvet" - 3.50
 "The Beast Is Us" - 4.02
 "Munchies" - 3.15
 "Invisible Media" - 3.36 
 "Goldfish Bowl" - 3.38
 "Riviera Hustle 3" - 3.45
 "Last One Out Turn Off the Lights" - 4.05

References 

2008 albums
Braintax albums